Adel Sellimi (born 16 November 1972) is a former football player and current manager.

As a child, he drew inspiration from the 1978 World Cup team who became the first African nation to win a World Cup match. At the age of 10, he joined his first club, Club Africain of Tunis, and he stayed there for the next 14 years, picking up two Tunisian league titles and one Tunisia Cup along the way.

He earned his first cap in September 1993, during a match against Germany.

Tunisians grew to appreciate his discretion in life outside football as a modest and determined professional. On the pitch, he distinguished himself at international level during the 1996 African Cup of Nations finals in South Africa as one of the best players of the tournament. Sellimi became a household name throughout the country, a skillful and talented bright spark who carried the team to the final of the tournament for the second time in their history. Sellimi struck twice in the semi-final against Zambia, and was widely considered one of the best players in the tournament.

This movement into the limelight earned the player a transfer to French Ligue 1 side FC Nantes Atlantique, following another impressive showing at the 1996 Olympic Games in Atlanta. But his move to France marked the start of a long barren period. Although the Nantes fans dubbed him "The Lung" on account of the distance he clocked up during matches, he never really settled in at his new club. He hit just two goals in 30 appearances in his first season, and failed to achieve the kind of success he had enjoyed back home in Tunisia. After another disappointing season in 1997/98, Sellimi left Nantes for Spanish second division side Real Jaén. It was here that he got some first-class matches, and finally found form. This surge in form earned him a call-up to the 1998 World Cup squad, where he put in steady performances against England and Romania.

2. Bundesliga side Freiburg took a gamble on Sellimi and partnered the player with other Tunisian internationals, anchorman Zoubeir Baya and fellow striker Mehdi Benslimane. But here too he took a long time finding his true form, and many at Freiburg considered him a mistaken purchase during his first year. However, he proved his detractors wrong in the best possible way in the 1999/2000 season. Sellimi just could not stop scoring goals and even headed the Bundesliga's goalscoring list going into the winter break.

A disappointing 2001 lead to Sellimi missing out on the 2002 African Cup of Nations in Mali and a number of international friendlies after a fall-out with former national coach Henri Michel. But the Frenchman's replacement with Ammar Souayah coupled with the national team's goal drought brought about Sellimi's recall. The 2002 World Cup in Korea and Japan turned out to be Adel Sellimi's swansong in premier football competitions, and he retired from international football shortly after the tournament at the age of 31. He returned to Club Africain shortly afterwards.

After retiring Sellimi became a manager, working in Tunisia and Qatar.

International goals
Scores and results list Tunisia's goal tally first, score column indicates score after each Sellimi goal.

References

External links
 
 

1972 births
Living people
Footballers from Tunis
Tunisian footballers
Association football forwards

Club Africain players
FC Nantes players
Real Jaén footballers
SC Freiburg players
Baniyas Club players

Tunisian Ligue Professionnelle 1 players
Ligue 1 players
Segunda División players
Bundesliga players
UAE First Division League players

Tunisian expatriate footballers
Expatriate footballers in France
Expatriate footballers in Spain
Expatriate footballers in Germany
Expatriate footballers in the United Arab Emirates
Tunisian expatriate sportspeople in France
Tunisian expatriate sportspeople in Spain
Tunisian expatriate sportspeople in Germany
Tunisian expatriate sportspeople in the United Arab Emirates

Tunisia international footballers
1994 African Cup of Nations players
1996 African Cup of Nations players
Olympic footballers of Tunisia
Footballers at the 1996 Summer Olympics
1998 FIFA World Cup players
2002 FIFA World Cup players

Tunisian football managers
AS Gabès managers
AS Marsa managers
Al-Khor SC managers
Tunisian expatriate football managers
Expatriate football managers in Qatar
Tunisian expatriate sportspeople in Qatar